Luiz Eduardo dos Santos Gonzaga (born 21 April 1990), commonly known as Dudu (ドゥドゥ), is a Brazilian footballer who plays as a forward. He currently play for FC Imabari.

Career
In August 2014, he signed for Kashiwa Reysol in J. League Division 1.

On 6 January 2023, Dudu signed to J3 club, FC Imabari for upcoming 2023 season.

Career statistics
.

Club

References

External links
 

 Profile at Ventforet Kofu

1990 births
Living people
Footballers from São Paulo (state)
Association football forwards
Brazilian footballers
Brazilian expatriate footballers
Associação Ferroviária de Esportes players
Barretos Esporte Clube players
Mogi Mirim Esporte Clube players
Clube Atlético Linense players
Clube Atlético Bragantino players
Figueirense FC players
Kashiwa Reysol players
Ventforet Kofu players
Avispa Fukuoka players
FC Machida Zelvia players
FC Imabari players
J1 League players
J2 League players
J3 League players
Campeonato Brasileiro Série A players
Campeonato Brasileiro Série B players
Batatais Futebol Clube players
Expatriate footballers in Japan
People from Itanhaém